Umberto Primo Calcinai (2 February 1892 – 26 July 1963) was a New Zealand rugby union player. Of Italian descent, Calcinai represented Wellington at a provincial level, and was a member of the New Zealand national side, the All Blacks, on their 1922 tour of New South Wales. His preferred playing position was wing-forward, but all five of his matches for the All Blacks on the 1922 tour were as a hooker. Calcinai did not appear in any Test matches.

References

1892 births
1963 deaths
New Zealand people of Italian descent
Rugby union players from Wellington City
New Zealand rugby union players
New Zealand international rugby union players
Wellington rugby union players
Rugby union hookers
Rugby union wing-forwards